Areobindus, also Ariobindas or Areovindas may refer to:
 Areobindus (consul 434) (died 449), consul in 434
 Areobindus Dagalaiphus Areobindus, grandson of the previous, consul in 506
 Areobindus (died 546), Byzantine general